Prunus × fruticans (or Prunus fruticans) is a species of shrubby Prunus, reaching about . It is thought to be a naturally occurring hybrid of sloe, Prunus spinosa, and bullace, Prunus domestica var. insititia, found mainly in Europe where their ranges overlap. It is a tetraploid.

References

fruticans
Hybrid prunus
Plants described in 1826
Interspecific plant hybrids
fruticans